Ulli Boegershausen (born 1954 in Rheda-Wiedenbrueck) is a German solo guitarist and guitar teacher. He is known internationally for his tours in Japan, America and Taiwan. He also authored several educational books for guitar playing.

Boegershausen started classical guitar music education at the age of 9. He played electric guitar in several music bands and further started academic studies for music teacher but did not finish.

He lives with his family close to Goettingen, Lower Saxony, Germany.

Ulli Boegershausen prefers playing steel string guitars. Ulli plays a Lakewood Guitars Ulli Boegershausen Signature model.

Ulli was mentoring Sungha Jung, a teenage fingerstyle guitar prodigy from Korea for the past 10 years.

Most important concerts
 International dance and folk festival Rudolstadt 1997 
 Guitar festival Wiesloch 1997
 Open Strings Festival Osnabrück 1997 and 1999
 Alte Oper Frankfurt 1986, 1988, 1991
 Guitar festival Nashville 2000 
 Convention Center Los Angeles 2000
 Folkalliance Cleveland 2000

Central Station Music Hall Taipeh 2002 
 Japan Tour 2000 and 2002
 Taiwan Tour 2001 and 2002
 Korea Tour 2010
 China Tours in 2014, 2016 and 2017.

Discography 
 1981 "ganz bestimmt vielleicht"
 1983 "Im Zwielicht"
 1984 "gegen die Zeit"
 1986 "autogen"
 1988 "Live" mit Mohammad Tahmassebi
 1991 "April" mit Reinhold Westerheide
 1993 "Best of..."
 1995 "ageless guitar solos"
 1998 "Pictures" mit Reinhold Westerheide
 1999 "Sologuitar" 15 Solostücke 
 2000 Personal Favourites – Super Audio CD, nur in Asien erhältlich
 2002 Private Stories
 2002 Christmas Carols
 2004 Chocolate and Wine
 2006 Ballads
 2007 Vinyl
 2008 Crimson
 2010 In a Constant State of Flux
 2012 Christmas Carols
 2013 15 Lullabies
 2014 Spring, Summer and Fall - Tunes from a Lifetime
 2017 Tides
 2018 The Celtic Album (digitally only)
 2019 Miniatures (digitally only)

Books 
 Profipicking leichtgemacht (including CD)
 Fingerstyleguitar leichtgemacht (including CD)
 Open Tunings leichtgemacht (including CD)
 D-Dur Tuning, "Das Loch in der Banane", DADGAD Tuning.
 Von Anfang an,  guitar course book in two volumes (including CDs, respectively)
 Ageless Guitar Solos (sheet music and tabulatures for same called CD)
 Mein DADGAD Sound (introduction into Open Tuning DADGAD)
 Easy Fingerstyle (including CD)
 Easy Fingerstyle 2 (including CD)
 10 Duets (with Franco Morone)
 Personal Favorites - Popsongs arranged for guitar
 Christmas Carols
 15 Lullabies
 More Personal Favorites
 Fingerstyle Guitar (instructional book in English, German and Chinese)
 German Folksongs

References

External links 
 http://www.boegershausen.com
 https://www.youtube.com/user/Boegershausen
 https://open.spotify.com/artist/7cfu1JFXiRLxUGdGdNt64V?si=Q1YLX8RARl2ki6bKEitsqQ

1954 births
Living people
German guitarists
German male guitarists
People from Bernkastel-Wittlich